Lloyd Richard Welch (born September 28, 1927) is an American information theorist and applied mathematician, and co-inventor of the Baum–Welch algorithm and the Berlekamp–Welch algorithm, also known as the Welch–Berlekamp algorithm.

Welch received his B.S. in mathematics from the University of Illinois, 1951, and Ph.D. in mathematics from the California Institute of Technology, 1958, under advisor Frederic Bohnenblust. He worked at the Jet Propulsion Laboratory 1956–1959, Institute for Defense Analyses in Princeton, 1959–1965, and University of Southern California, 1965–1999. He was elected a member of the National Academy of Engineering in 1979 for "contributions to an understanding of possibilities, limitations, and design of communications coding for reliability, security, and synchronization". He is also an IEEE Fellow, and received the 2003 Claude E. Shannon Award.

References 

 University of Southern California faculty web page
 National Academy of Engineering
 Caltech thesis
 AMS genealogy
 

American information theorists
Members of the United States National Academy of Engineering
Possibly living people
1927 births
University of Illinois alumni
California Institute of Technology alumni
University of Southern California faculty